HK Bosna is an ice hockey club from Sarajevo, Bosnia. The club was founded in 1980, and is the most established hockey club in the country. The club is part of the University Sport Society USD Bosna.

Honours

Bosnia and Herzegovina Hockey League:
Winners (2) : 2003, 2011.

History
Plans to get hockey in Bosnia and Herzegovina go back to the 1950s. However, this was not to be until later. HK Bosna was established on September 11, 1980, though it was relatively weak, being defeated by HK Spartak 59–1 and by HK Skopje 28–2. The club was boosted by the Olympics held in 1984. That same year, on February 3, the club entered the top tier of the Yugoslav Hockey League. The team got its revenge against Spartak that year, winning by 3–2. Hockey became quite popular in Sarajevo, as home games gathered thousands of spectators. The club brought in players from abroad to play for it. A notable win came against HK Olimpija, by 3–2 in front of some 8,000 fans. The best result of the club was in the 1986–1987 season. The quick success was short-lived, as the club fell into financial difficulties, resulting in its leaving of the league after the 1987–1988 season. The club, though not very competitive, continued to exist thanks to the enthusiasm of a number of supporting players and fans.

The club and hockey in general in Bosnia and Herzegovina came into grim times in the 1990s  due to the Bosnian War. In 1993 the home ice, Zetra, was destroyed. Thanks to HK Bosna, the BiH Ice Hockey Federation was formed that year. Zetra was rebuilt in 1998, and the club was quickly resurrected. Currently the club has both senior and junior sections.

Season by season record

Yugoslav Ice Hockey League
1985–1986 – 7th place
1986–1987 – 5th place
1987–1988 – 9th place

Bosnia-Herzegovina Hockey League
2002–2003 – 1st place

Ice hockey teams in Bosnia and Herzegovina
Sport in Sarajevo
1980 establishments in Bosnia and Herzegovina
Yugoslav Ice Hockey League teams
Ice hockey clubs established in 1980